Susanne Amatosero (born Susanne Klippel, 29 July 1952) is a Hamburg-based German artist and a writer/director of stage and radio dramas.

Biography
Susanne Kippel was born at Wittlich, a small town between Trier and Koblenz.   She later moved north, studying painting at the University of Fine Arts of Hamburg, following which she worked as a freelance photographer, contributing to national publications such as Zeit and Stern.   Starting in 1983 she undertook a succession of lengthy visits to the Caribbean - notably St. Lucia, Grenada and Jamaica - in order to undertake cultural comparative and ethnographic studies.   That gave rise to her first documentary film, "Die Reise der Pilgrim Number One" ("Journey of the Number One Pilgrim"), which won a special prize at the 1988 Paris Film Festival.

Since 1989 the focus of her writing has been on radio plays, the productions of which she usually undertakes herself.   The "sounds and noises" incorporated in these are a particular feature.   Her 1996 Bayerischer Rundfunk ("Bavarian Broadcasting") production of  "Funky Yard" won the gold medal at the 1997 "International Radio Festival of New York".

Personal
Susanne Amatosero's younger brother is the author .

Works (selection)

Books 
 Emilie Meier: lieber sich gesund schimpfen als krank heulen – bande dessinée (as Susanne Klippel), Munich 1977, Frauenbuchverlag (nowadays )
 Schwarz war ihr Haar, die Augen wie zwei Sterne so klar: Frauen in St. Pauli (as Susanne Klippel), Munich 1979, Frauenbuchverlag
 Mit Schwund muaßt rechnen! – Geschichten vom Münchner Müllberg (as Susanne Klippel), Munich 1980, Blatt GmbH
 StraßenRandBilder (as Susanne Klippel), München 1981, Frauenbuchverlag

Films 
 Die Reise der Pilgrim Number One, 1987 documentary film
 Starkstrom, Television film, 1992 (as Susanne Klippel) (first broadcast: 15 September 1992, ZDF)

Radio dramas

References

1952 births
Living people
People from Wittlich
Artists from Hamburg
Mass media people from Hamburg
German women photographers
German theatre directors
Women theatre directors
German women film directors
German documentary film directors
German radio writers
Women radio writers
Women documentary filmmakers